Fergusson Intermediate is a state co-educational intermediate school in the city of Upper Hutt, situated in the Wellington region of New Zealand. The school's classes are mixed, which means that both Year 7s and Year 8s are included in one class. The school website displays the exhortation: 'AMPLIFY THE AWESOME'.

History
Fergusson Intermediate was opened in 1966 by Sir Bernard Fergusson, then New Zealand's Governor General, and it is from his clan that the school's Latin motto originates.

Syndicates
The school is divided into 4 syndicates. In 2020, classrooms 1, 2, 3 and 4 made up syndicate A, classrooms 5, 6, 7 and 8 made up syndicate B, classrooms 9, 10, 11, 12 made up syndicate C, and classrooms 13, 14 and 15 made up syndicate D.

Notes

External links
 Official Website

Intermediate schools in New Zealand